Kruckow is a municipality in the Vorpommern-Greifswald district, in Mecklenburg-Vorpommern, Germany. It consists of the former municipalities of Borgwall, Heydenhof, Kartlow, Kruckow, Marienfelde, Schmarsow, Tutow-Dorf and Unnode. The municipality offers some important landmarks, such as the Renaissance/baroque Schmarsow Castle, the Neo Gothic Kartlow Castle, the ruin of Osten Castle or the Peter Joseph Lenné garden in Kruckow.

References

External links

Official website of Kruckow (German)

Vorpommern-Greifswald